Reduce is a general-purpose computer algebra system geared towards applications in physics.

The development of the Reduce computer algebra system was started in the 1960s by Anthony C. Hearn. Since then, many scientists from all over the world have contributed to its development under his direction.

Reduce is written entirely in its own LISP dialect called Portable Standard Lisp, expressed in an ALGOL-like syntax called RLISP. The latter is used as a basis for Reduce's user-level language.

Implementations of Reduce are available on most variants of Unix, Linux, Microsoft Windows, or Apple Macintosh systems by using an underlying Portable Standard Lisp or Codemist Standard LISP implementation. The Julia package Reduce.jl uses Reduce as a backend and implements its semantics in Julia style.

Reduce was open sourced in December 2008 and is available for free under a modified BSD license on SourceForge. Previously it had cost $695.

See also

 Comparison of computer algebra systems
 ALTRAN
 REDUCE Meets CAMAL - REDUCE Computer Algebra System - J. P. Fitch

References

External links
 
 
 Reduce wiki on SourceForge.
 Anthony C. Hearn, Reduce User's Manual Version 3.8, February 2004. In HTML format.
 Anthony C. Hearn, "Reduce: The First Forty Years", invited paper presented at the A3L Conference in Honor of the 60th Birthday of Volker Weispfenning, April 2005.
 Andrey Grozin, "TeXmacs-Reduce interface", April 2012.

Computer algebra system software for Linux
Computer algebra systems
Formerly proprietary software
Free computer algebra systems
Free software programmed in Lisp
Software using the BSD license